Joe Cotton (1882–after 1900) was an American Thoroughbred racehorse that is best known as the winner of the 1885 Kentucky Derby. He was sired by King Alfonso who also sired the 1880 Derby winner Fonso. The horse was reportedly named after a bookie.

Another African-American success
Trained by African-American Abraham Perry, Joe Cotton was ridden by Erskine Henderson who became the sixth of eleven African-American jockeys to ever win the Kentucky Derby.

Death
Joe Cotton was reportedly killed, along with another Thoroughbred called Sam Keene, on September 11, 1888 during the third race at the Mystic Park race track in Boston, Massachusetts. Joe Cotton dislocated a shoulder when he fell over the body of Sam Keene, the other horse having fallen and broken its neck while colliding with another foundering racehorse named Zero. Though reported as dead after the incident, the horse was bought by Charles Jacobs of Medford, Massachusetts. Jacobs reportedly took Joe Cotton to a river and allowed the horse to swim to reset his shoulder joint into place. Jacobs used Joe Cotton as a breeding stallion and raised Thoroughbred-cross horses. Joe Cotton was sent to New York in June 1892. By 1895, he was owned by a Mr. Newhall and was employed pulling a hack in Medford. The horse was frequently observed by horseman Frank Ware at a local steeplechase meeting until a few years before 1905 and is listed as a native stallion in the 1902 edition of the American Stud Book.

Pedigree

References

1882 racehorse births
Racehorses bred in Kentucky
Racehorses trained in the United States
Kentucky Derby winners
Thoroughbred family 12